The 1924 United States Senate election in Colorado took place on November 4, 1924. Republican Senator Lawrence C. Phipps ran for re-election to a second term. Senator Alva B. Adams, who held the other Senate seat, opted not to run for re-election in the special election, and instead decided to challenge Phipps for re-election. Adams's gambit turned out to be unsuccessful, as he lost to Phipps by roughly the same margin as Democrats lost the special election.

Democratic primary

Candidates
 Alva B. Adams, U.S. Senator

Campaign
Two separate elections for the U.S. Senate were held in 1924—the regularly scheduled election and a special election to fill the vacancy caused by Senator Samuel D. Nicholson's death in office. Alva B. Adams was appointed to fill Nicholson's seat, but rather than run for re-election, instead opted to challenge Phipps for re-election.

Results

Republican primary

Candidates
 Lawrence C. Phipps, incumbent U.S. Senator

Results

General election

Results

References

1924
Colorado
United States Senate